The NCTE George Orwell Award for Distinguished Contribution to Honesty and Clarity in Public Language (the Orwell Award for short), is an award given since 1975 by the Public Language Award Committee of the National Council of Teachers of English. It is awarded annually to "writers who have made outstanding contributions to the critical analysis of public discourse."

Noam Chomsky, Donald Barlett, and James B. Steele are the only recipients to have won twice.

Its negative counterpart, awarded by the same body, is the Doublespeak Award, "an ironic tribute to public speakers who have perpetuated language that is grossly deceptive, evasive, euphemistic, confusing, or self-centered."

Winners

1970s
1975: David Wise for The Politics of Lying
1976: Hugh Rank for the "Intensify/Downplay" schema for analyzing communication, persuasion, and propaganda
1977: Walter Pincus, Washington Post "A patient, methodical journalist who knew his job and who knew the jargon of Washington. Mr. Pincus was the man responsible for bringing to public attention, and thus to a debate in the Senate, the appropriations funding for the neutron bomb."—Hugh Rank, chair, NCTE Committee on Public Doublespeak
1978: Sissela Bok for Lying: Moral Choice in Public and Private Life
1979: Erving Goffman for Gender Advertisements

1980s
1980: Sheila Harty for Hucksters in the Classroom: A Review of Industry Propaganda in Schools
1981: Dwight Bolinger for Language--The Loaded Weapon
1982: Stephen Hilgartner, Richard C. Bell, and Rory O'Connor for Nukespeak: Nuclear Language, Visions and Mindset
1983: Haig Bosmajian for The Language of Oppression
1984: Ted Koppel, moderator, Nightline, ABC-TV. ". . . a model of intelligence, informed interest, social awareness, verbal fluency, fair and rigorous questioning of controversial figures. . . . [who has sought] honesty and openness, clarity and coherence, to raise the level of public discourse."—William Lutz, chair, NCTE Committee on Public Doublespeak
1985: Torben Vestergaard and Kim Schroder for The Language of Advertising
1986: Neil Postman for Amusing Ourselves to Death: Public Discourse in the Age of Show Business
1987: Noam Chomsky for On Power and Ideology: The Managua Lectures
1988: Donald Barlett and James B. Steele, Philadelphia Inquirer for a series of articles on the Tax Reform Act of 1986, in which they pointed out language disguising tax loopholes in the legislation
1989: Edward S. Herman and Noam Chomsky for Manufacturing Consent: The Political Economy of the Mass Media

1990s
1990: Charlotte Baecher, Consumers Union for Selling America's Kids: Commercial Pressures on Kids of the 90s
1991: David Aaron Kessler, Commissioner, Federal Food and Drug Administration. "Under the leadership of Commissioner Kessler," said William Lutz, chair of the NCTE Committee on Public Doublespeak, "the FDA has begun seizing products with misleading labels, developing new guidelines for clarity and accuracy in food labels, and exposing false, misleading, and deceptive health claims on food labels and in food advertising."
1992: Donald Barlett and James Steele, Philadelphia Inquirer for America: What Went Wrong?
1993: Eric Alterman: Sound and Fury: The Washington Punditocracy and the Collapse of American Politics
1994: Garry Trudeau, creator of the cartoon strip "Doonesbury" was cited for consistently attacking doublespeak in all aspects of American life and from all parts of the cultural and political spectrum.
1995: Lies of Our Times (LOOT) A Magazine to Correct the Record, was published between January 1990 and December 1994. It served not only as a general media critic, but as a watchdog of The New York Times, which the magazine referred to as "the most cited news medium in the U.S., our paper of record."
1996: William D. Lutz for The New Doublespeak: Why No One Knows What Anyone's Saying Anymore
1997: Gertrude Himmelfarb for "Professor Narcissus: In Today's Academy, Everything Is Personal," June 2, 1997, issue of The Weekly Standard
1998: Two winners
Juliet Schor for The Overspent American: Upscaling, Downshifting, and the New Consumer
Scott Adams for his role in "Mission Impertinent" (San Jose Mercury News West Magazine, November 16, 1997). The farce highlighted the absurdity of managerial language and the overuse of the "mission statement".
1999: Norman Solomon for The Habits of Highly Deceptive Media: Decoding Spin and Lies in the Mainstream News (published by Common Courage Press, 1999)

2000s
2000: Alfie Kohn for The Schools Our Children Deserve
2001: Sheldon Rampton and John Stauber for Trust Us, We're Experts!: How Industry Manipulates Science and Gambles with Your Future
2002: Bill Press for Spin This!
2003: Susan Ohanian, for the website [www.susanohanian.org]
2004: Investigative journalist Seymour Hersh and Writer Arundhati Roy
2005: Jon Stewart and the cast of The Daily Show
2006: Steven H. Miles, M.D, author of Oath Betrayed: Torture, Medical Complicity, and the War on Terror
2007: Ted Gup, author of Nation of Secrets: The Threat to Democracy and the American Way of Life
2008: Charlie Savage, author of Takeover: The Return of the Imperial Presidency and the Subversion of American Democracy
2009: Amy Goodman, co-founder, executive producer, and host of Democracy Now!

2010s
2010: Michael Pollan, author of Food Rules and co-narrator of Food, Inc.
2011: F.S. Michaels, author of Monoculture: How One Story Is Changing Everything
2012: Peter Zuckerman and Amanda Padoan, authors of Buried in the Sky
2013: Paul L. Thomas whose publications include "Ignoring Poverty in the U.S.: The corporate takeover of public education" (2012) and "Challenging Genres: Comic books and graphic novels" (2010). Dr. Thomas has also edited a recently published volume titled "Becoming and Being a Teacher: Confronting Traditional Norms to Create New Democratic Realities" (2013).
2014 The Onion for its satire and "treatment of dramatically sensitive issues that plague our culture", in particular U.S. gun culture.
2015: Anthony Cody for The Educator and the Oligarch
2016: David Greenberg for Republic of Spin: An Inside History of the American Presidency
2017: Richard Sobel for Citizenship as Foundation of Rights: Meaning for America
2018: Katie Watson for Scarlet A
2019: Michael P. Lynch for Know-It-All-Society: Truth and Arrogance in Political Culture

2020s
2020: Dr. April Baker-Bell, author of Linguistic Justice: Black Language, Literacy, Identity, and Pedagogy
2021: Kristin Kobes Du Mez for Jesus and John Wayne: How White Evangelicals Corrupted a Faith and Fractured a Nation
2022: David Chrisinger for Public Policy Writing That Matters

See also
Orwell Prize – British prize for political writing
Big Brother Awards
Doublespeak Award

References

External links
List of past winners (NCTE website)

George Orwell
American non-fiction literary awards
Awards established in 1975
1975 establishments in the United States